William Paterson (5 March 1897 – 31 July 1970) was a Scottish professional footballer who played as a centre forward. He began his career in Scotland in the 1910s and switched to English football twice. In 1926, he joined the American Soccer League where he led the league in scoring in the fall 1929 season.

Career 
Known as either Bill or Willie, Paterson spent time with Cowdenbeath and Rangers in Scotland before moving to Derby County of The Football League in 1921. He spent two seasons with Derby, where he was relegated from the First Division in 1921, before rejoining Cowdenbeath. He also spent time with Armadale. He then played with Coventry City during the 1925–26 season.

In the fall of 1926, he moved to the United States where he signed with the Springfield Babes of the American Soccer League. Paterson played only 13 games of the 1925–26 season with Springfield before jumping to the Fall River Marksmen, where he was reunited with the Egyptian Tewfik Abdullah with whom he played at Derby County, for 20 games. He did not finish the season with Fall River, but moved to the New Bedford Whalers for seven games. He spent the full 1927–28 season in New Bedford, but was transferred to the Providence Gold Bugs seven games into the 1928–29 season and would serve the club as player-manager. He finished the 1929 fall season as the league's leading scorer with 27 goals in 22 games.  In 1930, Paterson began the season with the New Bedford Whalers only to jump to the Brooklyn Wanderers. He then played the fall 1931 season with Fall River.

Personal life 
Paterson was the son of football manager Sandy Paterson and played under his father's management at Cowdenbeath. He had a half brother Archie Paterson who was also a footballer. He served as a gunner in the Royal Field Artillery during the First World War and served overseas before being demobbed in 1919.

References

External links
 Derby County career details

1970 deaths
Scottish footballers
Cowdenbeath F.C. players
Armadale F.C. players
Derby County F.C. players
Coventry City F.C. players
American Soccer League (1921–1933) players
Springfield Babes players
Fall River Marksmen players
New Bedford Whalers players
Providence Gold Bug players
Brooklyn Wanderers players
Fall River F.C. players
English Football League players
Scottish Football League players
Rangers F.C. players
Scottish expatriate sportspeople in the United States
Scottish expatriate footballers
Expatriate soccer players in the United States
Footballers from Fife
People from Hill of Beath
1897 births
Scottish football managers
Scottish expatriate football managers
Scottish Football League managers
American Soccer League (1921–1933) coaches
British Army personnel of World War I
Royal Field Artillery soldiers
Cowdenbeath F.C. managers
Association football forwards